The Feathered Serpent is the name of a major deity in various Mesoamerican cultures.

Feathered Serpent or The Feathered Serpent may also refer to:

The Feathered Serpent (1934 film), a British film directed by Maclean Rogers
The Feathered Serpent (1948 film), a 1948 Charlie Chan film
The Feathered Serpent (TV series), a British children's show
The Feathered Serpent, a 1981 novel by Scott O'Dell
The Feathered Serpent, a 1927 novel by Edgar Wallace
Feathered Serpent I, a raft built by Gene Savoy to support his claim that ancient Mexicans and Peruvians were in contact
Feathered Serpent II, Savoy's later research ship

Similar concepts
 The Plumed Serpent, a novel by D. H. Lawrence.
 A feather boa is a fashion accessory.